Lal Ranvijay Nath Shahdeo (5 February 1940 - 18 March 2019), was a lawyer, poet, writer and political activist. He was a prominent leader of the movement for a separate Jharkhand state. He was president of the Jharkhand Party. He wrote several Nagpuri poems, songs and slogans for the Jharkhand movement. At the end, the Central government of India accepted to form a new state, Jharkhand. He changed the state name Vananchal to Jharkhand after a debate with Prime minister Atal Bihari Vajpayee. He was the recipient of the  Jharkhand Ratna Award for his contribution to the movement for a separate state of Jharkhand.

Life

Early life
Lal Ranvijay Nath Shahdeo was born on 5 February 1940 in Lalgarh in Ranchi district in Bihar Province (now Jharkhand) to the Palkot Nagvanshi royal family. He was the son of Chhotelal Laxminath Shahdeo. He received his early education at home and teachers taught him Hindi, Sanskrit and English. His mother tongue was Nagpuri. He learnt the traditional nagpuri song from his father during his childhood.

He completed his M.A in Political Science and History at Ranchi University. He studied Law at Chotanagpur Law College. During his studies, he came in contact with writer Radhakrishna and political leader Jaipal Singh Munda.

Career
He was a lawyer for four decades. He was a nagpuri poet, story writer also a singer.

He joined the Jharkhand Party in 1957 and was a close associate of Jaipal Singh Munda. When Jaipal Singh Munda merged the Jharkhand Party with Congress on 20 June 1963, Lal Ranvijay did not support him and kept alive the Jharkhand Party. He was the president of Jharkhand Party. He give the slogan Jaipal, Bodra, Bage, Murga le ke Bhage which was popular during the Jharkhand movement. He wrote the Nagpuri poems and slogans for movement for a separate state of Jharkhand. He had a prominent role in the start of studies in the tribal and reignal languages in Ranchi University. He changed the state name Vananchal to Jharkhand though a debate with Prime minister Atal Bihari Vajpayee. He was president of Jharkhand Party till his death.

Death
He died on 28 March 2019 in raja dera in Ranchi.

Works
Lal Ranvijay was a poet and singer. He translated Bhagwat Gita in nagpuri. He was also editor of several books and magazines. He was known for Vir and Sringar ras poems. He composed around 350 nagpuri songs and poems. Some of his prominent works are:
Mati mange lahu
Barndo
Purab kar ranf(drama)
Piyasal
Atma
Aur shahnai baij uthlak
Darad
Manpuran(story)
Kundri kar larange
Admiman aur admiyat
Chotanagpur kar gaon me
Ekta(essay)
Jagi jawan chamki bijuri(collection of poem)
Puja kar Phul(collection of bhakti songs)
Khotha(collection of songs)

Awards and honours
In 2015, the Government of Jharkhand awarded him the Jharkhand Ratna Award for his contribution to the movement for a separate Jharkhand state by writing inspiring poems, songs and for his speeches. He was also awarded by Jharkhand Vidhan Sabha in 2017 and achieved the title of sher-e-jharkhand.

References 

People from Jharkhand
People from Ranchi
1940 births
2019 deaths
People from Ranchi district
Nagpuri-language writers
Nagpuria people